Majok is a given name and surname. Notable people with the surname include:
Abraham Majok (born 1998), Australian soccer player
Ater Majok (born 1987), Australian basketball player
Ayom Majok (born 2003), Australian footballer
Madang Majok, Sudanese politician
Martyna Majok (born 1985), Polish-American playwright

People with the given name include:
Majok Deng (born 1993), Australian basketball player
Majok Majok (born 1992), Sudanese basketball player